Priyadarshan Jadhav (born 29 April 1980) is a Marathi actor, director, producer and screenwriter.  He is known for his role in Ravi Jadhav's Timepass 2 (2015) as Dagadu.

Personal life
Priyadarshan was born on 29 April 1980 in Kolhapur. He currently lives in Mumbai with his wife Vaibhavi Gupte. He has a daughter Iraa and a newly born son Asim.

Career
Jadhav made his acting debut in Vijay Aso (2012). He was an actor and writer for the film Timepass 2, released in May 2015. He was in lead role for this movie along with Priya Bapat. He has also written screenplay for the prequel Timepass.

Priyadarshan has played pivotal roles in films like Chintoo 2 in 2013 and Vijay Aso in 2012. He was the associate director for the film Hapus in 2010. 2013 released Chintoo 2 - Khajinyachi Chittarkatha was also one of the opportunities to prove his acting. Portraying comic roles became his forte and he played entertained the audience in films like Jai Maharashtra Dhaba Bhatinda in 2012. Halal is Chinmay's Marathi film. Halal is directed by Shivaji Lotan Patil and produced by Amol Kagne. He won the Best Supporting actor for Halal at the 2017 Marathi Zee Cine Awards.

Drama
He is a director for plays in Marathi namely Jago Mohan Pyare with almost 750 shows, Delhichi Killi, the satirical comedy Pyaar Kiya To Darna Kya, Timepass (play), Cheherapheri, Gandhi Adava Yeto, Moruchi Mavshi, Mr. and Mrs., Susaat and Mumbaiche Kawale. He has been a prominent Theatre Actor with plays like Tumcha Mulga Karto Kay, Susaat, Moruchi Mavshi, Vichha Mazi Puri Kara, Shantecha Karta Chalu Aahe, Mr. and Mrs., Gandhi Adava Yeto, Cheherapheri, Popatpanchi, Mumbaiche Kawale, Timepass, Pyaar Kiya To Darna Kya, Delhichi Killi, Sagale Ubhe Aahet, Nava Gadi Nava Rajya.

Filmography
2003 Jatra

2007 Hyancha Kahi Nem Nahi

2010 Haapus

2012 Chintoo 2

2012 Vijay Aso

2013 Jai Maharashtra Dhaba Bhatinda

2014 Timepass (Writer)

2015 Timepass 2

2017 Halal

2017 Cycle

2017 Hampi

2017 Dhingana

2018 Bandh Nylon Che

2018 Majhya Baykocha Priyakar

2018 Mi Pan Sachin

2018 Ye Re Ye Re Paisa 2

2018 Maska

2019 Hirkani

2020 Choricha Mamla

2020 Dhurala

Television
He is well known for his skits in Fu Bai Fu, a Marathi standup comedy TV show on Zee Marathi and was also the winner of Fu Bai Fu: Naya Hai Yeh along with Vishakha Subhedar. He was also a part of Shejari Shejari Pakke Shejari on Zee Marathi. He made a special appearance in 51st episode of Dil Dosti Duniyadari as 'Dagadu' from Timepass 2. He also played the role of 'Rajabhau' (as young Dilip Prabhavalkar) in the Marathi television show Chuk Bhul Dyavi Ghyavi. He also hosted the 2017 Marathi Zee Cine Awards alongside Sumeet Raghavan and also won the Best Supporting Actor Award for Halal in the same.

Awards
 Zee Chitra Gaurav 2017 - Best Supporting Actor Halal

References

External links

Male actors from Mumbai
Male actors in Marathi cinema
Living people
Marathi actors
Film directors from Mumbai
1980 births
Male actors in Marathi television